Ric Hutton (1926–1996) was an Australian actor. He worked in Britain, Australia and the United States of America. Best known in Australia as the voice of " Black Jack Seager" in the hit Radio series "The Castlereagh Line" written by Ross Napier The Castlereagh Line

He was a radio personality as well.

Select Credits
The Life and Death of King Richard II  (1960)
The Grey Nurse Said Nothing (1960)
Stormy Petrel (1960)
In Writing (1961)
The Young Victoria (1963)
Guns at Batasi (1964)

References

External links
Ric Hutton at IMDb

1926 births
1996 deaths
Australian male actors
Australian expatriates in the United States
Australian expatriates in England